The South Pacific Games football tournament for men at the XII Games was held in Fiji, from 30 June to 11 July 2003.

Squads

Group stage

Group A

Group B

Semi-finals

Bronze-medal match

Gold-medal match

Goalscorers

See also
Football at the 2003 South Pacific Games – Women's tournament
Pacific Games

References

External links
Details on RSSSF website

2003
Football at the 2003 South Pacific Games
Pac
Pacific Games
2003 South Pacific Games